Dewey Mitchell is a former Olympian for the United States in the sport of judo. He participated in the 1984 Olympic Games, in Los Angeles.

References

Judoka at the 1984 Summer Olympics
Olympic judoka of the United States
American male judoka
Living people
Year of birth missing (living people)